V404 Cygni is a microquasar and a binary system in the constellation of Cygnus. The star and the black hole orbit each other every 6.47129 days at fairly close range. Due to their proximity and the intense gravity of the black hole, the companion star loses mass to an accretion disk around the black hole and ultimately to the black hole itself.

The "V" in the name indicates that it is a variable star, which repeatedly gets brighter and fainter over time. It is also considered a nova, because at least three times in the 20th century it produced a bright outburst of energy. Finally, it is a soft X-ray transient because it periodically emits short bursts of X-rays.

The black hole companion has been proposed as a Q star candidate.

Observation history

This system was first noted as Nova Cygni 1938 and given the variable star designation V404 Cygni.  It was considered to be an ordinary "moderately fast" nova although large fluctuations were noted during the decline.  It was discovered after maximum light, and the photographic magnitude range was measured at 12.5–20.5.

On May 22, 1989 the Japanese Ginga Team discovered a new X-ray source that was catalogued as GS 2023+338.  This source was quickly linked to V404 Cygni, which was discovered to be in outburst again as Nova Cygni 1989.

Follow-up studies showed a previously unnoticed outburst in 1956.  There was also a possible brightening in 1979.

In 2009, the black hole in the V404 Cygni system became the first black hole to have an accurate parallax measurement for its distance from the Solar System.

In April 2019, astronomers announced that jets of particles shooting from the black hole were wobbling back and forth on the order of a few minutes, something that had never before been seen in the particle jets streaming from a black hole.  Astronomers believe that the wobble is caused by the  Lense-Thirring effect due to warping of space/time by the huge gravitational field in the vicinity of the black hole.

2015 outburst

On 15 June 2015 NASA's Swift satellite detected the first signs of renewed activity. A worldwide observing campaign was commenced and on 17 June ESA's INTEGRAL Gamma-ray observatory started monitoring the outburst. INTEGRAL was detecting "repeated bright flashes of light time scales shorter than an hour, something rarely seen in other black hole systems", and during these flashes V404 Cygni was the brightest object in the X-ray sky—up to fifty times brighter than the Crab Nebula. This outburst was the first since 1989.

Other outbursts occurred in 1938 and 1956, and the outbursts were probably caused by material piling up in a disk around the black hole until a tipping point was reached. The outburst was unusual in that physical processes in the inner accretion disk were detectable in optical photometry from small telescopes; previously, these variations were thought to be only detectable with space-based X-ray telescopes. A detailed analysis of the INTEGRAL data revealed the existence of so-called pair plasma near the black hole. This plasma consists of electrons and their antimatter counterparts, positrons.

A follow-up study of the 2015 data found a coronal magnetic field strength of 461 ± 12 gauss, "substantially lower than previous estimates for such systems".

See also 
 List of stars in Cygnus
 List of black holes
 List of nearest black holes

References 

Cygnus (constellation)
X-ray binaries
Stellar black holes
Cygni, V404
K-type giants
Novae
Recurrent novae